Irene Pancras Uwoya (born December 18, 1988), is a Tanzanian actress, producer and entrepreneur she is best known for her name Irene Uwoya and for her movie role Oprah. Beginning her professional career in 2007 along with others bongo movie actors such as Vincent Kigosi, Steven Kanumba and many more.

Early life
Uwoya was born on December 18, 1988, in Dodoma, Tanzania, She started her primary school in Mlimwa School and later moved to Bunge School in Dar-es-salaam, she Later went to Greenville, in Kampala Uganda for secondary education .

Personal life 
In 2008 Irene married the Rwandan football player and the captain of the Rwanda international selection Hamad Ndikumana who later died. In 2011 the couple had one child named Krish and a few years later the couple split. In 2017 she married again, this time to the bongo flava musician Abdulaziz Chande known professionally as Dogo Janja.

Career 
In 2006 she contested in the Miss Tanzania Beauty Pageant and became fifth;  Wema Sepetu was crowned Miss Tanzania 2006–2007.

Irene Uwoya began her career as an actress in Bongo Movies in 2007. She been featured in more than 20 movies in and out of Tanzania.

Filmography

Film

Television

Awards and nominations

External links 
 Official Filmography Website

References 

1988 births
People from Dar es Salaam
Tanzanian female models
Tanzanian film directors
Tanzanian film actresses
21st-century Tanzanian actresses
Living people
People from Dodoma